Slavyansky (masculine), Slavyanskaya (feminine), or Slavyanskoye (neuter) is the name of several rural localities in Russia:
Slavyansky, Kabardino-Balkar Republic, a khutor in Maysky District of the Kabardino-Balkar Republic
Slavyansky, Stavropol Krai, a khutor in Mineralovodsky District of Stavropol Krai
Slavyanskoye (rural locality), a village in Sherbakulsky District of Omsk Oblast